is a Japanese free announcer. She is represented by Cent Force.

Filmography

Current appearances
TV series

Radio

Advertisements

Former appearances
As a YTV announcer

TV dramas

Films

References

External links
 

Japanese announcers
Japanese radio personalities
1983 births
Living people
People from Izumiōtsu, Osaka
Wakayama University alumni